Clyde Simms (born August 21, 1982) is an American former soccer player. He played in Major League Soccer from 2005 to 2013. He also represented the United States at international level.

Career

College
Born in Jamestown, North Carolina, and attended Southwest Guilford High School in High Point, North Carolina. Simms played college soccer at East Carolina University from 2000 to 2003, where he appeared in 72 games and notched seven goals and seven assists. He was team captain his final three years.

Professional
Simms went undrafted by Major League Soccer after college and instead signed with Richmond Kickers of the A-League. Although he had a relatively impressive first season with the Kickers and started 28 games for the club, Simms's talent was not really recognized until he was called into the United States national team camp as a replacement player due to a conflict between the United States Soccer Federation and the players in 2005. Simms greatly impressed in camp and, when the disagreement was settled, Simms was asked to remain in camp and train with the regular team.

Simms's performance in the national camp intrigued several MLS teams, and he was eventually signed as a discovery player by D.C. United on February 25, 2005. In the 2008 MLS season, Simms played in 30 MLS games, with 30 starts and two goals scored and two assists. He missed only 3 minutes the entire season.

After seven seasons with D.C. United, the club declined his 2012 contract option and he entered the 2011 MLS Re-Entry Draft. Simms was selected by New England Revolution in stage two of the draft on December 12, 2011. He agreed a contract with New England eleven days later.

Simms played two seasons for New England. He announced his retirement on February 13, 2014.

International
Simms has one cap for United States national team, which he received on May 28, 2005, when he came on as an injury-time substitute against England.

Honors

D.C. United
Major League Soccer Supporter's Shield (2): 2006, 2007
Lamar Hunt U.S. Open Cup (1): 2008

NC Hall of Fame 

Inducted into the NC Soccer Hall of Fame on January 24, 2015

References

External links
 
 

1982 births
Living people
African-American soccer players
American soccer players
D.C. United players
East Carolina University alumni
North Carolina FC U23 players
A-League (1995–2004) players
Richmond Kickers players
New England Revolution players
United States men's international soccer players
People from Jamestown, North Carolina
Soccer players from North Carolina
USL League Two players
Major League Soccer players
Association football midfielders
21st-century African-American sportspeople
20th-century African-American people